'WWA Cossipore English School' is a co-educational school in North Kolkata, India, founded in 1976. Affiliated to the Council for the Indian School Certificate Examinations, the school provides education from Kindergarten to Class XII. Students are offered the choice of two streams for High School - Science and Commerce.

It was originally set up initially for the children of the ordnance factory workers.

Sports - The children are divided into four houses - Red, Green, Blue and Yellow.  P. T. Classes are held from LKG to XII, once a week. Annual Sports event is held in Winter. Other Inter-House competitions are organized throughout the year. Students are also sent for inter school competitions. A big ground of the GSF is a refresher for the students.

Special activities

Scouts and Guides

Interact club

School band

References

Primary schools in West Bengal
High schools and secondary schools in West Bengal
Schools in Kolkata
Educational institutions established in 1976
1976 establishments in West Bengal